Barry S. Milligan is an American politician and banker from the state of Louisiana. A Republican, Milligan has represented the 38th district of the Louisiana State Senate, based in southern Shreveport, since 2020.

Career
Milligan has held positions at a variety of banking institutions, including Regions Financial Corporation, BancorpSouth, Home Federal Bank, and the Bank of Montgomery. Since 2019 he has served as owner of Louisiana Business Consulting, LLC, which he also founded.

Political history
In 2019, Milligan announced a run for State Senate against Democratic incumbent John Milkovich, who had garnered blowback for his unscientific comments on vaccinations and autism. Milligan defeated Milkovich and another Democrat with 51% of the vote in the first round.

References

Living people
People from Caddo Parish, Louisiana
People from Shreveport, Louisiana
Republican Party Louisiana state senators
Southeastern Louisiana University alumni
Centenary College of Louisiana alumni
21st-century American politicians
Year of birth missing (living people)